General Sir Michael Anthony Shrapnel Biddulph  (30 July 1823 – 23 July 1904) was a British Army officer who became Black Rod, a parliamentary official.

Military career
Educated at the Royal Military Academy, Woolwich, Biddulph was commissioned into the Royal Artillery in 1843. He served in the Crimean War taking part in the Battles of Alma, Balaclava and Inkerman as well as the Siege of Sevastopol. Posted to India in 1861, he was appointed Deputy Adjutant-General of Artillery in India in 1868, and was promoted major-general in 1869.

In 1875, he was made commander of the Rohilkhand district, and in 1878 moved to command the garrison at Quetta, near the Afghanistan border. When the Second Afghan War became imminent, he established a base for operations in southern Afghanistan, taking command of the 2nd division of the Kandahar Field Force when war broke out in November 1878. His division advanced into Afghanistan, and Biddulph was present when Kandahar was occupied in January 1879. He returned to India later that month in command of the Thal-Chotiali Field Force. In 1880, he was given command of the Rawalpindi district in India and, after promotion to general in 1886, he served as President of the Ordnance Committee from 1887 until retirement in 1890.

In retirement he served as Gentleman Usher of the Black Rod from 1896 to 1904 and was an Extra Groom in Waiting to King Edward VII from 1901 to 1904. He also took to watercolour painting.

Biddulph died on 23 July 1904 aged 80, and is buried at Kensal Green Cemetery.

Family
In 1857 he married Katharine Stamati, and the couple had five sons and five daughters.

External links

References

1825 births
1904 deaths
British Army generals
British Army personnel of the Crimean War
British military personnel of the Second Anglo-Afghan War
Burials at Kensal Green Cemetery
Ushers of the Black Rod
Knights Grand Cross of the Order of the Bath
Recipients of the Order of the Medjidie, 5th class
Chevaliers of the Légion d'honneur
Royal Artillery officers
Masters of the Jewel Office